Hansschlegelia plantiphila is a Gram-negative, aerobic and non-motile bacterium species from the genus of Hansschlegelia. Hansschlegelia plantiphila can utilize methanol.

References

Further reading 
 

Methylocystaceae
Bacteria described in 2010